Context as Other Minds (—subtitled The Pragmatics of Sociality, Cognition and Communication—) is a book, by Talmy Givón, published by John Benjamins in 2005.

Contents of Book
The book presents a model of human linguistic communication, based on the idea that language is an evolutionary adaptation, where speakers address themselves to the context of minds they believe to be similar to their own.

See also 

 Cognitive science
 Context
 Pragmatics
 Psycholinguistics
 Sociolinguistics

Notes and references

Bibliography 

 Givón, Talmy. Context as Other Minds: The Pragmatics of Sociality, Cognition and Communication. Amsterdam: John Benjamins, 2005.

External links 

 Context as Other Minds — LINGUIST List review by Kerstin Fischer (2006)

Pragmatics
John Benjamins Publishing Company books